The Vijfde Klasse is the tenth and lowest tier of football in the Netherlands and the eighth tier of Dutch amateur football. The league is divided into 37 divisions, 5 played on Saturday and 32 on Sunday.

Each division consists of 11 to 14 teams. The champions are promoted to the Vierde Klasse. Each season is divided into a number of periods. The winner of these periods qualify for promotion playoffs, provided they finish in the top nine overall in the season. Because the Vijfde Klasse is the lowest football tier, no teams are relegated or play relegation playoffs.

Vijfde Klasse divisions

References

10